San Pedro de Guasayán is a municipality and small town located between Catamarca and Santiago del Estero in Argentina.

References

Populated places in Catamarca Province
Populated places in Santiago del Estero Province